Hedwiges Eduard Martinus Maduro (born 13 February 1985) is a Dutch professional football coach and former player who is the assistant coach of Eerste Divisie club Almere City. Mainly a defensive midfielder during his playing career, he could also operate as a central defender, where he started his career at Ajax at the age of 19.

He spent several seasons in La Liga, mainly with Valencia where he appeared in 113 competitive games and won the 2008 Spanish Cup. He also competed professionally in Greece and Cyprus.

A Dutch international in the 2000s, Maduro represented the country at the 2006 World Cup.

Club career

Ajax
Maduro was born in Almere, Flevoland. At AFC Ajax he was voted as the Amsterdam club's brightest emerging talent in the 2003–04 season, and made his Eredivisie debut in the following campaign, his debut in the competition coming against Roda JC on 27 February 2005 in a 2–1 away win.

In the following years, Maduro started more often than not for Ajax, helping the team to two KNVB Cups and three Johan Cruyff Shields. He appeared in 105 games overall for them, scoring 11 goals.

Valencia
In mid-January 2008, after helping Ajax to the third consecutive Johan Cruyff Shield, Maduro joined Valencia CF, in a four-and-a-half-year deal worth €3 million – compatriot Ronald Koeman was the team manager. His La Liga debut came late in the month a 0–1 home loss against UD Almería, and he started in all 11 matches he played in his first year, but the Che could only finish tenth even though they won the Copa del Rey, with the player being an unused substitute in the final against Getafe CF (Koeman had already been fired at that point).

In his first full season in Spain, Maduro started playing a small role, a situation which was created after his late return from the 2008 Summer Olympics. However, new coach Unai Emery eventually awarded him minutes due to injuries and suspensions, and he performed well in various positions, including right-back. On 25 April 2009 he scored his first competitive goal for the club, netting from a corner kick to make it 1–1 against FC Barcelona in an eventual 2–2 home draw; with the team finally finishing in sixth position he made more than 30 appearances during the campaign, in spite of facing stiff competition from the likes of Alexis or Carlos Marchena, as only Raúl Albiol was an undisputed starter in the back-four sector.

Maduro spent the vast majority of 2011–12 on the sidelines, nursing a serious ankle injury.

Sevilla
On 5 June 2012, Sevilla FC announced on their official website the signing of Maduro on a free transfer. He turned down a contract extension at Valencia, and also had an offer from FC Spartak Moscow who had just hired his former boss Emery, finishing his debut season in Andalusia with 30 games all competitions comprised to help the side to the ninth place, in spite of being diagnosed with a heart condition in the previous summer.

With Míchel gone from the bench and Emery being hired as his replacement, Maduro was quickly deemed surplus to requirements.

PAOK
On 2 January 2014, it was announced that Maduro would sign with Greece's PAOK FC for two and a half years. The deal was confirmed five days later.

In February 2015, nursing a hand injury, Maduro requested a leave of absence and visited his former club Ajax. After being linked to Feyenoord, his contract expired and both parties agreed to part ways.

Omonia
On 20 July 2017, the 32-year-old Maduro signed a two-year contract with Cypriot First Division side AC Omonia for an undisclosed fee, arriving from FC Groningen. He made his debut on 10 September in the season opener, a 2–1 home win against Ethnikos Achna FC.

On 9 August 2018, Maduro announced his retirement through a short video on Twitter.

International career
Shortly after making his league debut with Ajax, Maduro won his first cap for the Netherlands on 26 March 2005, in a 2006 FIFA World Cup qualifier against Romania. He was picked for the final squad-of-23 by national team manager Marco van Basten – also his coach in Ajax's youth system – appearing four minutes in the 0–0 group stage draw against Argentina in an eventual round-of-16 exit.

In 2007, despite already having amassed 12 senior caps, Maduro took part in the UEFA European Under-21 Championship which was held in the Netherlands, and scored the competition's first goal when the Jong Oranje beat Israel 1–0. He also played in the second match, a 2–1 win against Portugal which secured a semi-final spot and qualification to the Olympic tournament.

In the semi-finals against England (1–1 after 120 minutes) Maduro successfully converted his penalty shootout attempt, as Holland won it 13–12 after 32 shots. The Dutch went on to retain their 2006 title by beating Serbia 4–1 in the final, and he was named in the 'UEFA Team of the Tournament'.

Coaching career
In addition to his work as an analyst on ESPN, Maduro also started his training as a professional football coach. During the 2018-2019 season, he was assistant coach to Erwin van de Looi at Jong Oranje. The following season he was assistant coach at the Netherlands Under 18. In mid-2020 he became head coach of Almere City U21. He led the team to the U21 Division 1 title in 2022. Since December 2021, he had also worked as assistant coach of the Almere City first team.

Personal life
Maduro's father was originally from Aruba, and his mother was from Curaçao, both islands in the Caribbean.

Career statistics

Club
Source:

Honours
Ajax
KNVB Cup: 2005–06, 2006–07
Johan Cruyff Shield: 2005, 2006, 2007

Valencia
Copa del Rey: 2007–08

PAOK
Greek Football Cup runner-up: 2013–14

Netherlands U21
UEFA European Under-21 Championship: 2007

Individual
AFC Ajax Talent of the Future/Talent of the Year: 2005

References

External links

Stats at Voetbal International 

CiberChe stats and bio 

National U21 team data 

1985 births
Living people
Dutch people of Aruban descent
Dutch people of Curaçao descent
Footballers from Almere
Dutch footballers
Association football defenders
Association football midfielders
Eredivisie players
AFC Ajax players
FC Groningen players
La Liga players
Valencia CF players
Sevilla FC players
Super League Greece players
PAOK FC players
Cypriot First Division players
AC Omonia players
Netherlands youth international footballers
Netherlands under-21 international footballers
Netherlands international footballers
2006 FIFA World Cup players
Footballers at the 2008 Summer Olympics
Olympic footballers of the Netherlands
Dutch expatriate footballers
Expatriate footballers in Spain
Expatriate footballers in Greece
Expatriate footballers in Cyprus
Dutch expatriate sportspeople in Spain
Dutch expatriate sportspeople in Greece